Titration is a common laboratory method of quantitative chemical analysis that is used to determine the unknown concentration of a known reactant.

Titration may also refer to:

 Acid–base titration, based on the neutralization reaction
 Complexometric titration, based on the formation of a complex between the analyte and the titrant
 Drug titration, medical dose titration, the stepwise titration of doses to determine a desired effect
 Redox titration, based on an oxidation-reduction reaction
 Thermometric titration, an instrumental technique
 Zeta potential titration characterizes heterogeneous systems such as colloids
 Dog Handling,Titration Titration is the amount of correction needed to stop an unwanted behavior.Titration is analogous to reactivity. Used in Law enforcement and military context.